Wallingford School is a secondary school with academy status located in the town of Wallingford, Oxfordshire, England. It was founded by Walter Bigg in 1659 in association with the Worshipful Company of Merchant Taylors, formally succeeding Wallingford Grammar School when it merged with Blackstone Secondary Modern in 1973.

Headteacher
The Headteacher is John Marston who joined the school in September 2019 following the retirement of the previous head, Wyll Willis. Willis was the Headteacher from 2006 to 2019, following the interim Headship of Douglas Brown. The Headteacher from September 2001 to August 2005 was Jerry Owens, who left to become a consultant Headteacher with Kent County Council. The school hit its nadir in 2005 both in terms of results and reputation. The school has enjoyed considerable success academically since 2012 finishing at or near the top of the performance tables for Oxfordshire for A Level and GCSEs. It is over-subscribed but is working towards the building of an extension in 2018/19.

Buildings
A number of buildings make up the school estate. These are named after various notable people from Wallingford or past teachers at the school.

The main blocks are:
 The Blackstone Building: with Geography, Art, The School Library and, more recently, the sixth form block. * The Main Building: with Reception, English, The School Hall, the Canteen, The Old Gym, Design & Technology, ICT, and many admin rooms.
 The Kershaw Building: with Maths, Drama, Music and Modern Foreign Language.
 The Doug Brown Building (formally named as the 'Science Block'): with Science and Technicians Offices.
 The Castle Leisure Centre (also known as 'The Castle'): for PE lessons and large assemblies.

In recent years, Wallingford School has purchased the Castle Leisure Centre from the current owners so the school can use the centre full-time and take over management of public sports events.

Sixth form
Wallingford School features two parts - the secondary school, and a sixth form college which merge to feature the same teachers, lesson structure, subjects, timetable, etc... Sixth Form students are part of the house system and have their own competitions that contribute to the overall scores.

All students at Wallingford School are guaranteed a place in Sixth Form, whatever their results at 16.

The main focus of the Sixth Form is A Levels. However, from September 2008, a small number of students each term in the sixth form can follow a "Pre A-Level" course that enables them to study for A-Levels if they did not achieve the required GCSE grades to do so by regular progression. These students can spend a year studying five GCSE subjects to retake, then continue with A Levels at the sixth form. There is a growing offer of Btec qualifications for students wanting to study but who want a different approach to the academic one of A Levels.

Past pupils
Charlie Brooker, journalist, screenwriter and TV presenter
Matt Rodda, politician and Member of Parliament for Reading East (2017–present)
Rob Wilson, politician and Member of Parliament for Reading East (2005–2017)

References

External links
Wallingford School website

Secondary schools in Oxfordshire
Academies in Oxfordshire
Wallingford, Oxfordshire